Khuzhiry (Khujar) is a rural locality (an ulus) in Tunkinsky District, Republic of Buryatia, Russia. The population was 951 as of 2010. There are 23 streets.

Geography 
Khuzhiry is located 3 km west of Kyren (the district's administrative centre) by road. Mogoy-Gorkhon is the nearest rural locality.

References 

Rural localities in Tunkinsky District